Michael Tranghese (born  1943) is the former commissioner of the Big East Conference and helped create the conference as founder Dave Gavitt's right-hand man in 1979. Tranghese retired as commissioner in the spring of 2009, with John Marinatto succeeding him as commissioner. Tranghese later served as a member of the College Football Playoff selection committee. He's a 1965 graduate of Saint Michael's College, where he was a member of the golf team. He was inducted into the school's athletic hall of fame in 1996.

References

1943 births
Living people
Big East Conference commissioners
College Football Playoff Selection Committee members
Saint Michael's College alumni